Sophie's Choice may refer to:

 Sophie's Choice (novel), a 1979 novel by American author William Styron
 Sophie's Choice (film), a 1982 American drama film directed by Alan J. Pakula
 Sophie's Choice (opera), an opera by the British composer Nicholas Maw

See also
 "Sophia's Choice", an episode of season 4 of The Golden Girls